Elki Guernama is a lake in Niger, Bilma Department.

Sources 
 Map E-33-VII

Lakes of Niger